Alistair Donald Macleod (born 1938) is a former research professor of church history at Tyndale University College and Seminary in Toronto.

Macleod was born in Philadelphia, Pennsylvania, and studied at McGill University, Harvard University, and Westminster Theological Seminary. He was ordained as a minister in the Presbyterian Church in Canada, and served as a pastor and church planter. He was president of the Evangelical Fellowship of Canada from 1973 to 1975 and General Secretary of the Inter-Varsity Christian Fellowship of Canada from 1975 to 1980. He then helped establish the Renewal Fellowship of the Presbyterian Church in Canada, and served as its Chairman from 1980 to 1985.

Macleod has written a number of biographies of figures in church history, including W. Stanford Reid, C. Stacey Woods, and Charles Cowan. He has been awarded Doctor of Divinity degrees from both Gordon–Conwell Theological Seminary and Westminster Theological Seminary.

References

1938 births
20th-century Canadian historians
20th-century Canadian male writers
20th-century Presbyterian ministers
21st-century Canadian historians
21st-century Canadian male writers
21st-century Presbyterians
Calvinist and Reformed scholars
Canadian evangelicals
Canadian historians of religion
Canadian male non-fiction writers
Canadian Presbyterian ministers
Evangelical pastors
Harvard University alumni
Historians from Ontario
Historians of Christianity
Living people
McGill University alumni
Religious biographers
The Stony Brook School alumni
Academic staff of Tyndale University College and Seminary
Westminster Theological Seminary alumni
Writers from Philadelphia
Writers from Toronto
Harvard Graduate School of Arts and Sciences alumni